Norman Robert McLeod (13 April 1879 – 3 April 1913) was an Australian rules footballer who played with Melbourne in the Victorian Football League (VFL).

Notes

External links 

1879 births
1913 deaths
Australian rules footballers from Victoria (Australia)
Melbourne Football Club players